Argyranthemum foeniculaceum, called the Canary Island marguerite, is native to the Canary Islands, (part of Spain). It is widely cultivated as an ornamental and naturalized in California and Australia.

References

External links
Flowers of the Canary Islands photo

Glebionidinae
Endemic flora of the Canary Islands
Plants described in 1809
Garden plants